Jesse C. Dayton (born 1825 in Westerlo, Albany County, New York; died May 26, 1903 in Colonie, New York) was an American merchant and politician from New York.

Life
In 1844, he went to New York City, became first a clerk, and then a merchant. Later he bought a farm in Watervliet where he resided while still looking after his business interests in New York City. He was Supervisor of Watervliet in 1873.

He was a member of the New York State Senate (13th D.) in 1874 and 1875.

Dayton had a brother, George Dayton, who happened to serve in the New Jersey State Senate at the same time as his own service in the New York State Senate.

Dayton died in Colonie, New York "from the infirmities incident to old age", at the age of 77.

References

Sources
 Life Sketches of Government Officers and Members of the Legislature of the State of New York in 1875 by W. H. McElroy and Alexander McBride (pg. 52ff) [e-book]

External links
 The Jesse C. Dayton Papers at New York State Library

1825 births
Democratic Party New York (state) state senators
People from Westerlo, New York
Town supervisors in New York (state)
People from Watervliet, New York
1903 deaths
19th-century American politicians